Giorgio Gaber, byname of Giorgio Gaberscik (25 January 1939 – 1 January 2003), was an Italian singer, composer, actor, and playwright. He was also an accomplished guitar player and author of one of the first rock songs in Italian ("Ciao ti dirò", 1958). With Sandro Luporini, he pioneered the musical genre known as teatro canzone ("song theatre").

Biography

Debut 
He was born in Milan into a lower-middle-class family. His father, Guido Gaberscik, was born in Trieste, when the city was still part of Austria-Hungary. The surname Gaberscik is of Slovene origin (Gaberščik). His mother was from the Veneto region. The two met and married in Veneto and later moved to Milan, where Giorgio was born.

Gaber began to play as rehabilitation for an injury to his hand which required constant but not strenuous activity to recover his motor skill.  Since his health as a child was not the best and his older brother Marcello played guitar, he was encouraged to play as well.  The outcome was good both in terms of his health and artistically, and at only fourteen years of age he was engaged to play at a New Eve's party and earned his first paycheck of 1,000 lire.

Subsequently, he began to frequent the Santa Tecla, a venue in Milan where he had the chance to meet musicians of the time, including Luigi Tenco, Gianfranco Reverberi, Adriano Celentano, Ricky Gianco, and Mogol, who obtained a contract for Gaber with Dischi Ricordi.  He then played with the Rocky Mountains Old Time Stompers (replacing Tony Dallara who had left to pursue a solo career) and with Rolling Crew.

Because neither Tenco nor Gaber were yet members of the Italian Society of Authors and Publishers they could not trademark the song "Ciao ti dirò" ("I'll Say Hi to You", inspired by Elvis Presley's "Jailhouse Rock"), which was signed off by Giorgio Calabrese and Giampiero Reverberi despite being composed by Tenco and Gaber.

The two went on to continue writing music together, developing at the same time a close friendship.  In 1958 they toured Germany together with Adriano Celentano, Enzo Jannacci, Paolo Tomelleri e Gianfranco Reverberi.

Gaber paired up with Enzo Jannacci as I Due Corsari ("The Two Privateers"), who made their debut at the end of 1958 with two vinyl singles – "Come Facette Mammeta", a classic song of Neapolitan humour, and "Non occupatemi il telefono" ("Don't Hog the Telephone").  They continued to release singles with Dischi Ricordi throughout the following year, and in 1960 released their first album, Giorgio Gaber – Enzo Jannacci.

After a sentimental-artistic companionship with singer and actress Maria Monti, he married Ombretta Colli in 1965, then a student of languages (Chinese and Russian) at the University of Milan. In 1966 she gave birth to daughter Dalia.

He took part to Festival di Sanremo four times, with the songs "Benzina e cerini" ("Petrol and Matches") in 1961, "Così felice" ("So Happy") in 1964, "Mai, Mai, Mai Valentina" ("Never, Never, Never Valentina") in 1966 and "...E allora dai" ("...Well Come On Then!") in 1967.

Il signor G 
In 1969 he released one of his best known successes, "Com'è bella la città" ("How Beautiful the City Is"), an example of the introduction of social matters in a song. The following year, he showed at Piccolo teatro his first edition of Il Signor G ("Mister G"), a recital he repeated in many Italian squares.

In 1973, he recorded the one song by which he is most recognized by international audiences: Far Finta di Essere Sani which was covered in English as Tomorrow's Got to be Sunny by Tony Orlando and Dawn on their 1975 album He Don't Love You (Like I Love You).

A year later, he was given the very first Premio Tenco award, and many years later, also received the Targa Tenco in 2001 for his song "La razza in estinzione" ("The Dying Race")  and in 2003 for the album Io non mi sento italiano ("I Don't Feel Italian"). After the Tenco award Gaber abandoned television and began to tour only in theatres, as one of the founders of the teatro canzone genre. He would appear again in TV, although sporadically, only in the 1990s and early 2000s.

Death

A lifelong smoker, Giorgio Gaber died on New Year's Day 2003 after a long battle with lung cancer, in his country house in Montemagno near Camaiore, in Tuscany, and is buried at the Monumental Cemetery of Milan.

In 2004, the refurbished underground auditorium of the Pirelli Tower in Milan was dedicated to him.

In 2012 Patti Smith recorded the cover of Io come persona, translated into English "I as a person", contained in the anthological album ...io ci sono.

On the 25th of January, 2022, Gaber was honoured with a Google Doodle in celebration of his 83rd birthday.

Discography 
 Il signor G (1970)
 I borghesi (1971)
 Dialogo tra un impegnato e un non so (1972)
 Far finta di essere sani (1973, studio)
 Far finta di essere sani (theatre recording, 1973–74)
 Anche per oggi non si vola (1974)
 Libertà obbligatoria (1976)
 Polli di allevamento (1978)
 Pressione bassa (1980)
 Io se fossi Dio (1980)
 Anni affollati (1981)
 Il teatro di Giorgio Gaber (1982)
 Gaber (1984)
 Io se fossi Gaber (1985)
 Piccoli spostamenti del cuore (1987)
 Parlami d'amore Mariù (1987)
 Il Grigio (1989)
 Storie del signor G (1991, VHS)
 Il teatro canzone (1992)
 Ma per fortuna che c'è... Giorgio Gaber (1994)
 Io come persona (1994)
 E pensare che c'era il pensiero (1994)
 E pensare che c'era il pensiero (1995)
 Gaber 96/97 (1996)
 Un'idiozia conquistata a fatica (1997)
 Un'idiozia conquistata a fatica" (1998, 2nd version)
 Gaber 1999/2000 (1999)
 La mia generazione ha perso (2001)
 Io non mi sento italiano (2003)

There is also a large discography of LPs and 45s related to his production of pop music songs and ballads. Ja-Ga brothers''  (1983) with Enzo Jannacci, is the reprinting of the 1960 recordings of the two singers.

See also 
 Enzo Jannacci
 Luigi Tenco
 Adriano Celentano
 Festival di Sanremo

References

External links

Far finta di essere... Gaber 
Associazione Culturale Giorgio Gaber official website 

1939 births
2003 deaths
Italian pop singers
Singers from Milan
Italian male guitarists
Italian male  singer-songwriters
Italian male actors
Italian people of Slovene descent
Burials at the Cimitero Monumentale di Milano
20th-century Italian  male singers
20th-century guitarists
Theatre people from Milan